For constitutional office-holders called Lord Chancellor, see

 Lord Chancellor of France
 Lord Chancellor, a senior functionary in the government of the United Kingdom
 Lord Chancellor of Ireland
 Lord Chancellor of Scotland
 Lord High Chancellor of Sweden